Habibollah Asgaroladi Mosalman (‎; 3 January 1932 – 5 November 2013) was a leading senior Iranian conservative and principlist politician who was the leader of Islamic Coalition Party, a highly influential conservative political party in Iran. He was also a two-time presidential candidate, first in July 1981 and next in 1985. During the presidential elections in 1981, in which he ran for the presidency, an attempt was made to assassinate him outside his home in Iran Street, but this failed and resulted in his bodyguard being killed but Asgaroladi himself escaped largely unhurt.

Career and activities
Asgaroladi was born to a wealthy merchant family in Damavand. His ancestors were Jews who converted to Shia islam. Asgaroladi was a senior member of Iran's Expediency Council. He spent many years at the forefront of the Iranian cabinet, serving as both Secretary of State for Social Security, Minister for Economy, Trade and Commerce as well as heading up the Homeland Security Agency and intelligence services in Iran. He ran in the 1981 and 1985 Presidential elections. An attempt was made on his life in a failed assassination attempt in 1981.  Asgaroladi was a prominent member of Khomeini's inner circle and returned to Iran from Neuphle-le-Chateau with Araghi & Beheshti. Since the Islamic Revolution of 1979,  he was chosen by Khomeini to be the founding father of the Khomeini Relief Foundation, the largest social welfare branch of the government in Iran. Some unofficial reports include him among the wealthiest individuals in Iran with a net worth of several billion dollars. Several members of the Asgaroladi family have been featured in the Fortune 500 ("Millionaire Mullahs" article), with Asadollah Asgaroladi possessing an estimated wealth of over US$9 billion. The Asgaroladis are now amongst the wealthiest families in Iran with commercial interests in real estate, banking, healthcare and exports of dried fruits, nuts, caviar and saffron.

Asgaroladi published his autobiography in 2012 and was presented with an award by Ali Larijani, speaker of the Iranian Parliament. He died on 5 November 2013 in Tehran's Dey Hospital after being hospitalized for more than two months. His funeral was attended by the Supreme Leader Khamenei, President Hassan Rouhani, Mohsen Rafiqdoost, Ali Larijani and many other senior government officials.

Related Pages 
 Asadollah Asgaroladi

References

1932 births
2013 deaths
Government ministers of Iran
Deputies of Tehran, Rey, Shemiranat and Eslamshahr
Islamic Coalition Party politicians
Iranian people of Jewish descent
Members of the 1st Islamic Consultative Assembly
Second Deputies of Islamic Consultative Assembly
Candidates in the July 1981 Iranian presidential election
Central Council of the Islamic Republican Party members
Secretaries-General of political parties in Iran
Politicians from Tehran